Such Blinding Stars For Starving Eyes is the first full-length album from Omaha, Nebraska band Cursive. Unlike Cursive's later releases, which were released by Saddle Creek Records, this album was released by Crank! Records.

Track listing

Personnel
Tim Kasher – vocals, guitar
Steve Pedersen – guitar
Matt Maginn – bass
Clint Schnase – drums
AJ Mogis – recording, engineering, production
Mike Mogis – recording, engineering, production
Eric Medley – mastering

Additional personnel
Eric Medley – mastering
Ian J. Whitmore – photographs, booklet interior

References

External links
Official Cursive website
Saddle Creek Records

1997 debut albums
Cursive (band) albums
Saddle Creek Records albums
Albums produced by Mike Mogis